Stanley County is a county in the U.S. state of South Dakota. As of the 2020 census, the population was 2,980. Its county seat is Fort Pierre. The county was created in 1873, and was organized in 1890. It is named for David S. Stanley, a commander at Fort Sully from 1866 to 1874, which was located nearby.

Stanley County is included in the Pierre, SD Micropolitan Statistical Area.

Geography
Stanley County's northwestern boundary is defined by the Cheyenne River which flows eastward, to discharge into the Missouri River at the most northerly point of Stanley County. From there, the county's northeast boundary is defined by the southeastward-flowing Missouri. The county terrain consists of semi-arid rolling hills, carved by drainages. The area is partially devoted to agriculture. The terrain slopes to the east; its highest point is in the SW county corner, at 2,198' (670m) ASL.

The eastern portion of South Dakota's counties (48 of 66) observe Central Time; the western counties (18 of 66) observe Mountain Time. Stanley County is on the western end of counties which observe Central Time, and its residents are split east–west in their time observance. Although Fort Pierre, the seat of Stanley County, is located in the Mountain Time Zone, most residents of the city use Central Time because of close social and economic ties with Pierre, which is located in the Central Time Zone.

Major highways

  U.S. Highway 14
  U.S. Highway 83
  South Dakota Highway 34
  South Dakota Highway 63
  South Dakota Highway 1806

Adjacent counties

 Dewey County - north
 Sully County - northeast
 Hughes County - east
 Lyman County - southeast
 Jones County - south
 Haakon County - west
 Ziebach County - northwest

Protected areas

 Antelope Creek State Game Production Area
 Antelope Creek State Lakeside Use Area
 Brush Creek State Game Production Area
 Chantier Creek State Game Production Area
 Chantier Creek State Lakeside Use Area
 Fort George State Game Production Area
 Fort Pierre National Grassland (part)
 Foster Bay State Lakeside Use Area
 Frozen Man Creek State Game Production Area
 Hayes Lake State Game Production Area
 Minneconjou State Game Production Area
 Minneconjou State Lakeside Use Area
 Oahe Downstream State Recreation Area
 Schomer Draw State Game Production Area
 West Shore State Lakeside Use Area

Lakes
 Lake Oahe (part)
 Lake Sharpe (part)

Demographics

2000 census
As of the 2000 census, there were 2,772 people, 1,111 households, and 775 families in the county. The population density was 2 people per square mile (1/km2). There were 1,277 housing units at an average density of 0.9 per square mile (0.3/km2). The racial makeup of the county was 93.04% White, 0.18% Black or African American, 4.91% Native American, 0.29% Asian, 0.14% from other races, and 1.44% from two or more races. 0.43% of the population were Hispanic or Latino of any race.

There were 1,111 households, out of which 33.60% had children under the age of 18 living with them, 55.60% were married couples living together, 10.10% had a female householder with no husband present, and 30.20% were non-families. 25.20% of all households were made up of individuals, and 7.90% had someone living alone who was 65 years of age or older. The average household size was 2.49 and the average family size was 2.98.

The county population contained 27.10% under the age of 18, 7.10% from 18 to 24, 28.20% from 25 to 44, 26.60% from 45 to 64, and 11.00% who were 65 years of age or older. The median age was 38 years. For every 100 females, there were 101.60 males. For every 100 females age 18 and over, there were 98.00 males.

The median income for a household in the county was $41,170, and the median income for a family was $47,197. Males had a median income of $29,911 versus $20,898 for females. The per capita income for the county was $20,300. About 6.60% of families and 8.70% of the population were below the poverty line, including 10.80% of those under age 18 and 12.80% of those age 65 or over.

2010 census
As of the 2010 census, there were 2,966 people, 1,228 households, and 857 families in the county. The racial makeup of the county was 90.0% white, 6.6% American Indian, 0.3% black or African American, 0.1% Asian, 0.2% from other races, and 2.8% from two or more races. Those of Hispanic or Latino origin made up 0.7% of the population. In terms of ancestry, 46.4% were German, 12.5% were Irish, 10.8% were English, 10.7% were Norwegian, 8.4% were Czech, 5.0% were Swedish, and 2.5% were American.

Of the 1,228 households, 30.8% had children under the age of 18 living with them, 56.7% were married couples living together, 8.5% had a female householder with no husband present, 30.2% were non-families, and 26.2% of all households were made up of individuals. The average household size was 2.42 and the average family size was 2.87. The median age was 41.9 years.

The median income for a household in the county was $51,875 and the median income for a family was $54,722. Males had a median income of $33,929 versus $25,574 for females. The per capita income for the county was $27,435. About 8.8% of families and 11.9% of the population were below the poverty line, including 18.1% of those under age 18 and 17.3% of those age 65 or over.

Communities

City
Fort Pierre (county seat)

Unincorporated communities

Hayes
Mission Ridge
 Sansarc
 Wendte

Townships
Stanley County has no townships. It is divided into three areas of unorganized territory: Lower Brule, North Stanley, and South Stanley.

In popular culture
The Triple U Buffalo Ranch in northern Stanley County was used in filming the 1990 movie Dances with Wolves.

Notable person
 Casey Tibbs (1929–1990): cowboy, rodeo performer, and actor

Politics
Stanley County have traditionally voted Republican. No Democratic presidential candidate has won Stanley County since Lyndon Johnson in 1964, whilst Michael Dukakis during the drought-affected 1988 election is the last Democrat to top forty percent.

See also

 National Register of Historic Places listings in Stanley County, South Dakota

References

 
Pierre, South Dakota micropolitan area
1890 establishments in South Dakota
Populated places established in 1890
Counties in multiple time zones